Sylvester O. Ogbaga (born 7 July 1961) is a Nigerian politician from the Peoples Democratic Party. He was member of the House of Representatives for Abakaliki/Izzi in Ebonyi State but retired at the 2023 election to run for the governorship of Ebonyi State but was eliminated in the primary.

References 

Living people
1961 births
21st-century Nigerian politicians
Peoples Democratic Party (Nigeria) politicians

Members of the House of Representatives (Nigeria)
Politicians from Ebonyi State